The World Crazy Golf Championships (WCGC) have been staged since 2003 at the Adventure Golf Complex on Crazy Golf Course on the seafront of Hastings, East Sussex.

Individual players from all over the world contest for the prestigious trophy.
including England, Scotland, Wales, Ireland, Finland, Germany, Czech Republic, Portugal and the United States. During the tournament's 19-year history (to 2022), 7 different players have managed to lift the coveted trophy.

Rules and History of the WCGC
The World Crazy Golf Championships is open to everyone with no age restriction.
There are also categories for women, juniors and novices each having their own dedicated trophies. The World Championship Crazy Golf courses at Hastings Adventure Golf on the town's seafront contain many hazards and obstacles over the 18 holes, including a water wheel, a windmill, an obelisk, lighthouse, ramps, bends, twists and bunkers.
The World Crazy Golf Championships is a miniature golf tournament which has its own unique playing rules, such as every player using the same type of ball, thus able to have a world championship competition of its own.
Up to 102 competitors (in 2005) play six qualifying rounds, four on the Saturday and two on Sunday, with just the lowest scoring 18 players making the cut to participate in the final round. Since 2010, the championship has been played on one course, the crazy golf, an Arnold Palmer type course with obstacles. Prior to this, it was played on two different 18 hole courses, the crazy golf and the former mini golf course.
The winner also receives £1000 in prize money, and a further £2000 is distributed to the placed players.
In 2013 Czech teenager Olivia Prokopová became the first female winner and also the youngest ever champion at the age of 18.
The World Crazy Golf Championships part of the tour of the British Minigolf Association (BMGA) which is the governing body for minigolf sport, including crazy golf.
The event is normally held in October, with the final played on Sunday afternoon, in front of enthusiastic spectators, in 2007 the mayor of Hastings watched the final and then presented the prizes and trophies to the winning players.

WCGC Results 2003 to 2022

WCGC Roll of Honour - Champions 2003 onwards

WCGC Video History

 2022 World Crazy Golf Championship courtesy of Brian the Brave
 2021 World Crazy Golf Championship courtesy of Britclip
 2019 World Crazy Golf Championship courtesy of Britclip
 2018 World Crazy Golf Championship courtesy of Britclip
 2017 World Crazy Golf Championship courtesy of Britclip
 2016 World Crazy Golf Championship courtesy of Youtube
 2015 World Crazy Golf Championship courtesy of Youtube
 2014 World Crazy Golf Championships - Final Hole
 2014 World Crazy Golf Championship courtesy of Britclip
 2013 WCGC winner Olivia Prokopová
 2012 World Crazy Golf Championship - Final Hole of the Final Round
 2011 World Crazy Golf Championships - Final Play-off
 2010 World Crazy Golf Championship courtesy of World Business
 2009 World Crazy Golf Championship From Sky Sports News
 2007 World Crazy Golf Championship courtesy of Youtube

References

Crazy golf
Miniature golf
Annual events in the United Kingdom
Sport in East Sussex